Filipina Brzezińska-Szymanowska (1 January 1800 – 11 November 1886) was a Polish pianist and composer. She was born in Warsaw, the daughter of Franciszek Szymanowski and Agata Wołowska. She studied with Charles Mayer and was influenced by her sister-in-law, composer Maria Szymanowska. She married Franciszek Jakub Brzeziński (1794–1846) and had four children: Franciszka Teofila Krysińska (born Brzezińska), Kazimierz Brzeziński, Teofila Zieleńska (born Brzezińska) and Aniela Brzezińska.

Brzezińska-Szymanowska composed works for organ and piano. In 1876 she published a collection of short organ preludes. She died in Warsaw.

Works
Selected works include:
Nocturne
Verlaß uns nicht (Do not leave us)
Fifteen short preludes for organ
In the Tatra Mountains
Urbi et Orbi, cantata

References

External links
 Scores by Filipina Brzezińska-Szymanowska in digital library Polona

1800 births
1886 deaths
19th-century classical composers
Women classical composers
Polish composers
Musicians from Warsaw
19th-century women composers
Polish women composers